Desim may refer to:
Habibabad, Shushtar, a village in Iran in Shahid Modarres Rural District, in the Central District
Tunceli, a city in Turkey, it is the capital of Tunceli Province
Misspelling of Deism